Ralph Lothar (1910–1981) was a German film actor and director.

Selected filmography
 I Entrust My Wife to You (1943)
 And the Heavens Above Us (1947)
 Chemistry and Love (1948)
 Girls Behind Bars (1949)
 Nights on the Nile (1949)
 Quartet of Five (1949)
 After the Rain Comes Sunshine (1949)
 Guitars of Love (1954)
 The Missing Miniature (1954)
 Sergeant Borck (1955)
 One Woman Is Not Enough? (1955)
 Hotel Adlon (1955)
 Black Forest Melody (1956)
 Santa Lucia (1956)
 The Night of the Storm (1957)
 Two Hearts in May (1958)
 Melody of Hate (1962)

References

Bibliography
 Goble, Alan. The Complete Index to Literary Sources in Film. Walter de Gruyter, 1999.

External links

1910 births
1981 deaths
Film directors from Berlin
German male film actors
Male actors from Berlin